= Cribrospora =

Scientific classification
- Kingdom: Fungi
- Division: Basidiomycota
- Class: Agaricomycetes
- Order: Agaricales
- Family: incertae sedis
- Genus: Cribrospora; Pacioni & P. Fantini (2000)

Type species
- Cribrospora tulostomoides Pacioni & P. Fantini (2000)

Genus of fungi

Cribrospora is a genus of fungus in the order Agaricales. It is incertae sedis with respect to familial placement within the order. The genus is monotypic, containing the single species Cribrospora tulostomoides, found in Europe.
